Live at Amoeba Music is a live EP by the New York City band TV on the Radio. Released in 2007 on Interscope Records, the EP contains four live tracks recorded during an in-store performance at Los Angeles music store Amoeba Music on September 22, 2006. It is only available through Indie Record Shops. All of the tracks are taken from their critically acclaimed 2006 album Return to Cookie Mountain.

Track listing
"Blues from Down Here" – 5:43
"Wolf Like Me" – 5:15
"Province" – 5:09
"Wash the Day" – 7:51

References

TV on the Radio albums
2007 live albums
Live EPs
2007 EPs
Interscope Records live albums
Interscope Records EPs